Renata Mirra Ana Maria Fronzi (August 1, 1925 – April 15, 2008) was an Argentine-born Brazilian television and film actress. She was well known for her role as the character, Helena, in the Brazilian television show, Família Trapo. Família Trapo aired on TV Record, the commercial name for Rede Record, from 1967 until 1971. Fronzi appeared on the show opposite a number of actors including Ronald Golias, Jô Soares, Otello Zeloni, Cidinha Campos and Renato Corte Real.

Early life
Renata Fronzi was born in the city of Rosario, Santa Fe, Argentina. She was the daughter of two Italian-Argentine theater actors. She first moved to Brazil with her parents and settled in Santos, Brazil, which is located along the Atlantic coast in São Paulo state.

Career
Fronzi began her career by performing at the Theatro Municipal in São Paulo, Brazil. Her professional debut occurred in 1940 when she appeared in actress Eva Todor's theater company production of Na Peça Sol de Primavera. She also appeared on the big screen in several Brazilian films during her career, including several movies produced by Atlântida Cinematográfica film studio. Her television credits included Minha Doce Namorada in 1971, Pecado Rasgado in 1978, Chega Mais in 1980, Jogo da Vida in 1981, Corpo a Corpo in 1984 and A Idade da Loba  in 1995. Many of her television roles and telenovelas, including Corpo a Corpo and Chega Mais, aired on Rede Globo. On television, Fronzi also had a recurring role in the telenovela, Malhação, from 1996 until 1997. She also appeared in the Brazilian miniseries, Memorial de Maria Moura, in 1994.

Fronzi's most recent film roles included Copacabana, directed by Carla Camurati, and the 2005 film Coisa de Mulher, directed by Brazilian director, Eliana Fonseca.

Personal life

Death
Renata Fronzi died at the age of 82 of multiple organ dysfunction syndrome, which was brought on by diabetes, on April 15, 2008, at the Hospital Municipal Lourenço Jorge in the Barra da Tijuca neighborhood of western Rio de Janeiro. She had been hospitalized in the intensive care unit of the hospital since April 1, 2008.

Fronzi was the widow of Brazilian radio announcer, César Ladeira, whom she had married in the 1940s. She was also the mother of Brazilian screenwriter, César Ladeira Filho.

Filmography

Television
 1966/67 - O Rei dos Ciganos
 1974 - Corrida do Ouro
 1978 - Pecado Rasgado
 1980 - Chega Mais
 1981 - Jogo da Vida
 1983 - Pão Pão, Beijo Beijo
 1984 - Corpo a Corpo
 1990 - Mico Preto
 1991 - A História de Ana Raio e Zé Trovão
 1995 - A Idade da Loba
 1997 - Malhação
 1999/2001 - Zorra Total

References

External links

1925 births
2008 deaths
Actresses from Rosario, Santa Fe
Brazilian people of Italian descent
Brazilian film actresses
Brazilian telenovela actresses
Argentine emigrants to Brazil
People from Santos, São Paulo
Deaths from multiple organ failure